Carola Toelle (born Henriette Dorothea Helene Karola Toelle; 2 April 1893 – 28 January 1958) was a German stage and film actress. She was the elder sister of the actress Uschi Elleot.

Selected filmography
 Johannes Goth (1920)
 Hazard (1921)
 Country Roads and the Big City (1921)
 Four Around a Woman (1921)
 About the Son (1921)
 The Pearl of the Orient (1921)
 Kean (1921)
 The Flight into Marriage (1922)
 The Man of Steel (1922)
 Christopher Columbus (1923)
 The Red Rider (1923)
 Wedding in Barenhof (1942)
 Immensee (1943)
 Tierarzt Dr. Vlimmen (1944)
 The Enchanted Day (1944)

Bibliography
 Hardt, Ursula. From Caligari to California: Erich Pommer's Life in the International Film Wars. Berghahn Books, 1996.

External links

1893 births
1958 deaths
German stage actresses
German film actresses
German silent film actresses
Actors from Hanover
20th-century German actresses